Fabien Robert (born 6 January 1989) is a French footballer who plays for English club Gloucester City as an attacking midfielder.

Club career

Lorient
Robert is a product of the FC Lorient Centre de Formation, having previously played for local side AS Lanester. Following great success playing on Lorient's under-18 and CFA 2 squad, on 15 June 2007, he signed an unprecedented five-year professional contract effectively keeping him with Lorient until 2012. He was promoted to the senior squad for the Ligue 1 2007–08 season and assigned the number 28 shirt. He made his professional debut on 1 September 2007 in a league match against Strasbourg appearing as a substitute in the 60th minute. The final result was a 0–0 draw. Over the course of the season, he made eleven appearances, nine of them as a substitute and one start, his first ever, in a 0–0 draw against Le Mans.

Doncaster Rovers (loan)
On 31 January 2012, Robert joined Championship side Doncaster Rovers on loan until the end of the season. After making four appearances as a substitute, he finally started the match against Birmingham City which ended in a 3–1 defeat on 30 March 2012. He scored his first goal for Doncaster in the 4–3 defeat to Portsmouth on 14 April 2012.

Swindon Town
On 30 July 2015 Robert joined Swindon on a one-year-contract (plus one optional). He scored his first goal for the club in a 2–2 draw away at Bury.

Forest Green Rovers
On 4 August 2016, it was announced that Robert had signed for National League side Forest Green Rovers. He was part of the squad winning the promotion to League Two in the Play off at Wembley.

He made a bright start, with his loan deal being extended, but picked up an injury, causing Robert's loan to be terminated and he returned to Forest Green. However, on 15 January 2018, Robert re-joined Aldershot Town on a loan deal until the end of the season. On 20 September, Robert joined National League South side Gloucester City on a one-month loan deal. The deal was then extended by another month.

International career
Robert is available for selection with the France under-21 team and appeared in a FIFA non-sanctioned friendly with the under-21s against the Paris Saint-Germain Reserves played in January 2009. On 25 May 2009, he was selected to the under-20 squad to participate in the 2009 Mediterranean Games.

Career statistics

References

External links

(1) https://www.over-blog.com/Fabien_Robert_biographie-1095204201-art85675.html
 LFP Profile
 Profile at FC Lorient

1989 births
Living people
People from Hennebont
French footballers
Footballers from Réunion
FC Lorient players
US Boulogne players
Doncaster Rovers F.C. players
Swindon Town F.C. players
Forest Green Rovers F.C. players
Aldershot Town F.C. players
Ligue 1 players
English Football League players
French expatriate footballers
Expatriate footballers in England
French expatriate sportspeople in England
France youth international footballers
Association football midfielders
National League (English football) players
Gloucester City A.F.C. players
Sportspeople from Morbihan
Footballers from Brittany
Brittany international footballers